James Edward Gannon  (November 26, 1873 – April 13, 1966) was a professional baseball player. He was a pitcher for the Pittsburgh Pirates of the National League in one game, on June 15, 1895. He pitched five innings, allowing one earned run in the game. He also spent several years in the minors, finishing his career in 1900.

References

1873 births
1966 deaths
Major League Baseball pitchers
Baseball players from Pennsylvania
Pittsburgh Pirates players
19th-century baseball players
Erie Blackbirds players
Springfield Ponies players
Providence Clamdiggers (baseball) players
Sharon Ironmongers players
Syracuse Stars (minor league baseball) players
Buffalo Bisons (minor league) players
Rochester Brownies players
Montreal Royals players
Rochester Patriots players
Ottawa Wanderers players
Newport Colts players
Hartford Indians players
Youngstown Little Giants players
Marion Glass Blowers players